Hridoy Islam is a Bangladeshi film actor. He won Bangladesh National Film Award for Best Child Artist for the film Taka (2005). Riaz briefly served in the Bangladesh Air Force before joining the film industry.

Selected films
 Taka - 2005

Awards and nominations
National Film Awards

References

External links

Bangladeshi film actors
Best Child Artist National Film Award (Bangladesh) winners
Living people
Year of birth missing (living people)